Mizhou or Mi Prefecture was a zhou (prefecture) in imperial China in modern southeastern Shandong, China. It existed (intermittently) from 585 until 1368 upon the foundation of the Ming dynasty.

Counties
Mi Prefecture administered the following counties through history:

References

 
 
 

Prefectures of the Sui dynasty
Prefectures of the Tang dynasty
Prefectures of Later Tang
Prefectures of Later Zhou
Prefectures of Later Jin (Five Dynasties)
Prefectures of Later Liang (Five Dynasties)
Prefectures of Later Han (Five Dynasties)
Prefectures of the Song dynasty
Prefectures of the Jin dynasty (1115–1234)
Prefectures of the Yuan dynasty
Former prefectures in Shandong
585 establishments
6th-century establishments in China
1368 disestablishments in Asia
14th-century disestablishments in China